Michael Kay may refer to:

 Michael Kay (sports broadcaster) (born 1961), American sports announcer and broadcaster
 Michael Howard Kay (born 1951), British XML developer
 Michael Kay (professor), American academic
 Michael Kay (footballer) (born 1989), English footballer
 Michael Kay (cricketer) (born 1981), former English cricketer
 Michael Kay (songwriter), English singer, songwriter and record producer